The Nations team event competition at the FIS Alpine World Ski Championships 2019 was held on 12 February 2019.

FIS Overall Nations Cup standings
The participating nations were seeded according to the overall nations cup standings prior to the World Championships.

Bracket
In case of a tie, the single times of the fastest men and women would determine the winning team.

References

Nations team event